Tu Aashiqui (Translation: You are my love) is a 2017 Indian musical drama romance television show based on two lovers' efforts to unite. It is produced by Mahesh Bhatt under Gurudev Bhalla production house. It stars Jannat Zubair Rahmani, Ritvik Arora and Rahil Azam as Pankti, Ahaan and JD respectively.

The series premiered on Colors TV on 20 September 2017 and had its last episode telecast on 12 October 2018.<ref>{{cite web|url=http://www.indiantelevision.com/television/tv-channels/gecs/colors-reinvents-prime-time-with-tu-aashiqui-ishq-mein-marjawans-unconventional-storytelling-170918|title=Colors reinvents prime-time with 'Tu Aashiqui', 'Ishq Mein Marjawans unconventional storytelling|date=18 September 2017|access-date=21 November 2017}}</ref>

Plot
Pankti Sharma is a beautiful young girl. Kind-hearted and charming, Ahaan Dhanrajgir is a musician. He meets and falls for Pankti, who also feels an attraction to him. Her mother Anita, being a failed actress and almost completely bankrupt, sells Pankti for money to Ahaan's rich, cruel and manipulative uncle, the middle-aged JD.

Ahaan wants to save Pankti and fulfill her dream of becoming successful singer. Eventually, he frees Pankti whose sister, Poorva falls in love with her boss, Monty after Anita sells her to him.

Eventually, the truth about JD is exposed to the entire family. JD's wife, Sheetal (Himanshi Choudhry), asks for a divorce but JD makes her sign over all her property to him. JD tries to kill Sheetal but she ends up in a coma. Pankti now pursues her singing career with Ahaan's support. JD posts indecent photos of Pankti but Ahaan supports her and they run away to live a new life where no one knows them. JD threatens to kill Poorva unless Anita files a complaint against Ahaan for abducting Pankti. Ahaan and Pankti are given shelter in a village but have to escape from JD again and go to the house of Uday Mathur (Rushal Parekh), Ahaan's best friend and manager. Ahaan tries to clear Pankti's name by lying about the photos being fake but Pankti appears on the talk show and clears her own name by telling the truth. Sheetal wakes up from the coma and shoots JD but unbeknownst to her, it is a fake bullet. Sheetal is arrested and JD is presumed dead.

JD returns under the persona of a man named Reyansh Diwan (Raqesh Bapat) and befriends Ahaan and Pankti organizing a concert in London where Ahaan is attacked by a hooded goon. Sheetal is released on bail and discovers Reyansh is actually JD. She tries to warn Ahaan and Pankti but JD blackmails her to stay silent and kidnaps her. Pankti and Ahaan argue and Reyansh makes matters worse by creating more misunderstandings between them. Pankti sets up a trap for Reyansh and decodes Sheetal's last message as "JD is Reyansh". Pankti and Uday defeat JD along with Sheetal's son, Vikram (Buneet Kapoor), and free Ahaan and Sheetal. JD is arrested, and the family celebrate.

Ahaan and Pankti meet a famous singer named Rangoli Rai (Krissann Barretto). In public, Rangoli pretends to be nice but behind closed doors she is obsessed with herself and her fame. Vikram becomes jealous of the attention Ahaan gets and instead of launching Ahaan as JMD's new face, he launches Rangoli. Rangoli tries to get close to Ahaan. Pankti struggles as people in the music industry remind her of her past as a mistress and try to take advantage of her. Ahaan becomes friends with Rangoli.

Rangoli comes to sing the final recording of a song but can't hit any notes right. The music director wants to replace her with Pankti angering Rangoli. Vikram does not want Pankti to sing as she is not a member of the JMD Company. Ahaan instead organises a concert for Pankti, but Rangoli has the concert cancelled. Ahaan, Pankti and Rangoli are scheduled to sing at a charity concert organized by KK. Fans praise Pankti's voice over Rangoli's and Vikram decides to sign Ahaan and Pankti for the benefit of his company. Rangoli plans to separate Ahaan and Pankti. Pankti discovers Rangoli's intentions but Ahaan doesn't believe her. Pankti gets upset, gathers evidence against Rangoli, and finally exposes her.

Ahaan and Pankti are set to be married on the same day as Monty and Poorva. Before Ahaan and Pankti can complete their vows, the police arrive and arrest Ahaan as Rangoli has accused him of rape. Ahaan is taken into custody while Rangoli tells Ahaan that she would take her complaint back if he marries her but he refuses. Ahaan's trial begins and Rangoli hires Dinesh Khandelwal (Ashwin Kaushal), a cunning lawyer. Eventually, Ahaan's mother, Aparna Dhanrajgir (Dolphin Dwivedi) becomes Ahaan's lawyer and wins the court case in Ahaan's favour.

Pankti and Ahaan overcome all their problems, and marry. The show ends with Ahaan and Pankti living happily with their family.

Cast
Main
Jannat Zubair Rahmani as singer Pankti Sharma: Anita's daughter; Poorva's sister; Ahaan's wife (2017–2018)
Ritvik Arora as Musician Ahaan Dhanrajgir: Aparna and Manav's son; Kaira's brother; Vikram's cousin; Pankti's husband (2017–2018)

Recurring
Rahil Azam as Jayant Dhanrajgir (JD): Manav's brother; Sheetal's husband; Vikram's father; Kaira and Ahaan's uncle; Pankti's former boss (2017–2018)
Gauri Pradhan Tejwani as Anita Sharma: A former actress; Poorva and Pankti's mother (2017–2018)
 Rushal Parekh as Uday Mathur: Ahaan's friend and manager (2017–2018)
 Nidhi Shah as Poorva Sharma: Anita's daughter; Pankti's sister; Monty's wife (2017–2018)
 Kiran Raj as Monty/Murali Shetty: Owner of Rhythm Music Company; Poorva's husband (2017–2018)
 Himanshi Choudhry as Sheetal Rajput: JD's wife; Vikram's mother; Kaira and Ahaan's aunt (2017–2018)
 Dolphin Dwivedi as Advocate Aparna Singhania: Manav's wife; Kaira and Ahaan's mother; Vikram's aunt (2017–2018)
 Sachin Sharma as Manav Dhanrajgir: JD's brother; Aparna's husband; Kaira and Ahaan's father; Vikram's uncle (2017–2018) 
 Vamika Kaul as Kaira Dhanrajgir: Aparna and Manav's daughter; Ahaan's sister; Vikram's cousin (2017–2018)
 Buneet Kapoor as Vikram Dhanrajgir: Sheetal and JD's son; Kaira and Ahaan's cousin; Richa's husband (2017–2018)
 Shagun Sharma as Richa Thakur: Pankti's friend; Vikram's wife (2017–2018)
 Raqesh Bapat as Reyansh Diwan, JD in Disguise(2018)
 Reem Shaikh as Shanaya Seth: Ahaan's childhood friend. (2018)
 Krissann Barretto as Singer Rangoli Rai (2018)
 Ashwin Kaushal as Advocate Dinesh Khandelwal (2018)
 Ankur Nayyar as Randhir Ahluwalia (2018)
 Sammy Jonas Heaney as Ben (2018)

 Special appearances
 Arjun Bijlani as Deep Raj Singh from Ishq Mein Marjawan (2017)
 Aalisha Panwar as Aarohi Raj Singh from Ishq Mein Marjawan (2017)
 Vineet Raina as Inspector Virat Raichand from Ishq Mein Marjawan (2018)
 Varun Kapoor as Dr. Veer Malhotra from Savitri Devi College & Hospital (2018)
 Swarda Thigale as Dr. Saanchi Mishra from Savitri Devi College & Hospital (2018)
 Vivian Dsena as Harman Singh from Shakti - Astitva Ke Ehsaas Ki (2018)
 Rubina Dilaik as Soumya Singh from Shakti - Astitva Ke Ehsaas Ki (2018)
 Sara Khan as Mohini from Shakti - Astitva Ke Ehsaas Ki (2018)
 Vijayendra Kumeria as Suraj Rajvanshi from Udaan Sapnon Ki (2018)
 Meera Deosthale as Chakor Singh from Udaan Sapnon Ki (2018)
 Rohan Gandotra as Parth Bhanushali from Dil Se Dil Tak (2018)
 Rashami Desai as Shorvori Bhattacharya from Dil Se Dil Tak (2018)
 Jasmin Bhasin as Teni Negi from Dil Se Dil Tak (2018)
 Ravi Dubey as Host– in Episodes 120–121 (2018)

 Diljit Dosanjh as Judge– in Episodes 120–121 (2018)
 Shankar Mahadevan as Judge– in Episodes 120–121 (2018)
 Monali Thakur as Judge– in Episodes 120–121 (2018)

Soundtrack
Mostly composed and sung by Rahul Jain as Ahaan's voice. The tune of "Har Dafa" was reused for "Tu Aashiqui (Romantic Version)", and a snippet of the main tune in "Tu Aashiqui (Rock Version)" was used in the composition of "Tu Wafa".

Track listing

 Awards and nominations 

International broadcasting
 In Pakistan the show aired on Play TV.
 In Reunion Island the show aired on Réunion Première.
 In France the show aired on RTI2 with the title Toi Mon Amour''
 In South Africa the show titled "The Cost of Love" aired on Glow TV (StarSat channel 570 and Openview channel 140).
 In Morocco This program was broadcast on 2020 on 2M

References

External links

Indian musical television series
Indian drama television series
Indian romance television series
Hindi-language television shows
2017 Indian television series debuts
Television shows set in Mumbai